Othman "Osmond" Karim (born 19 March 1968) is a Swedish film director, documentary producer, television presenter and photographer.

Background
Karim was born in Kampala, Uganda on March 19, 1968. In 1975, he, his parents, and his four siblings fled Idi Admin's regime and settled in first in Uppsala, then in Skåne. His brother Baker is a director in his own right; brother Alexander and one of their sisters are actors.

He graduated from the Brooks Institute of Photography in California with a BA with honors in Film and TV Production and worked for Amblin Entertainment before returning to Sweden.

He is married to film producer Malin Holmberg-Karim; they have four children.

Career
He hosted the Swedish news program Mosaik from 2000-2002 before leaving to focus on his directing career and production company One Tired Brother. His 1999 documentary Uganda du Fria (The Promised Land) was met with critical acclaim; Sveriges Television submitted it to Prix Europa in 2001. In 2006, Karim's first feature film, Om Sara, won the Golden St. George Prize for Best Film at the 28th Moscow International Film Festival. Shortly after, it was awarded a Viewer's Choice award at the Kolkata International Film Festival. Danny Glover was cast in his 2010 film För kärleken, which garnered a lot of interest.

He served as a member of the jury at the 29th Moscow International Film Festival and Nordisk Panorama Film Festival in 2007.

Filmography

Awards

References

External links
 
 
 Berlinale profile
 

Swedish film directors
1968 births
Living people
Swedish television journalists
Swedish people of Ugandan descent
Brooks Institute alumni